The 2018–19 PGA Tour was the 104th season of the PGA Tour, and the 52nd since separating from the PGA of America. The season began on October 4, 2018. The 2019 FedEx Cup Playoffs begun on August 8, and concluded on August 25, 2019, with Rory McIlroy winning his second FedEx Cup title.

Changes for 2018–19

Schedule
The schedule contained 46 events, two fewer than the previous season. The schedule was shortened in an effort to complete the FedEx Cup Playoffs by the end of August. 

As announced in 2017, the PGA Championship was moved from August to May on the weekend before Memorial Day, starting in 2019. The PGA of America cited the addition of golf to the Summer Olympics, as well as cooler weather enabling a wider array of options for host courses, as reasoning for the change. It was also believed that the PGA Tour wished to re-align its season so that the FedEx Cup Playoffs would not have to compete with the start of football season in late-August. Consequently, The Players Championship was moved from May back to March for the first time since 2006.

New exemption
The PGA Tour added a one-time exemption for those who made 300 career cuts. J. J. Henry was the first to take advantage.

Events
On hiatus: The Houston Open and Greenbrier Classic were not included in the shortened season, but they did return in the autumn of 2019 as part of the 2019–20 PGA Tour schedule.

New: Two new events were added to the schedule: the Rocket Mortgage Classic, played at Detroit Golf Club in Detroit, Michigan, and the 3M Open, played at the TPC Twin Cities in Blaine, Minnesota. 

Relocations: The WGC Invitational was relocated from Akron, Ohio to Memphis, Tennessee when FedEx took over sponsorship of the event. Firestone Country Club no longer hosts a PGA Tour event, but the Senior Players Championship is now contested there, with Bridgestone taking over as that event's title sponsor.

Canceled: The FedEx St. Jude Classic ceased due to the WGC event; the WGC-FedEx St. Jude Invitational, was played at the Classic's former location in Memphis. The Quicken Loans National; played in the Washington, D.C. area, no longer appeared on the PGA Tour schedule. The FedEx Cup playoff event; the Dell Technologies Championship, was also removed from the schedule with the number of playoff events reducing to three. The Northern Trust alternated between New Jersey, and Boston (the site of the Dell Technologies Championship).

Rules
From January 1, 2019 onwards, tournaments followed the new rules released by the USGA and The R&A which were designed to speed up the pace of play. The most noticeable changes included golfers being able to putt on the green with the flag remaining in, and drops being made from knee rather than shoulder height.

Prize money
As well as changes to individual tournament prize funds, the FedEx Cup postseason bonus money increased by $25 million to $60 million, with the FedEx Cup champion getting $15 million. The winner of the Tour Championship will be the FedEx Cup champion. The Tour Championship begins with each player having an adjusted score relative to par which relates to the amount of FedEx Cup points accumulated (previously the Tour Championship was structured similar to other tournaments, and awarded FedEx Cup points). The Tour Championship no longer have its own separate prize fund.

In addition, the Wyndham Rewards Top 10 was introduced, a $10 million bonus to be divided among the FedEx Cup top 10 regular season finishers.

The tour also introduced the Aon Risk Reward Challenge. In most tournaments, a single hole is allocated to contribute to the challenge. A player's best two scores from every participating event a player competes in throughout the season is used. The player with the lowest average to par score wins $1m. The initiative is replicated on the LPGA Tour.

Schedule 
The following table lists official events during the 2018–19 season.

Unofficial events
The following events were sanctioned by the PGA Tour, but did not carry FedEx Cup points or official money, nor were wins official.

Location of tournaments

FedEx Cup

Points distribution

The distribution of points for 2018–19 PGA Tour events is:

Tour Championship starting score (to par), based on position in the FedEx Cup rankings after the BMW Championship:

FedEx Cup standings
For full rankings, see 2019 FedEx Cup Playoffs.

Final FedEx Cup standings of the 30 qualifiers for the Tour Championship:

• Did not play

Awards

See also
List of 2019 PGA Tour card holders
2018 in golf
2019 in golf
2019 Korn Ferry Tour
2019 PGA Tour Champions season
2019 European Tour
2019 FedEx Cup Playoffs

Notes

References

External links
Official site

2019
2018 in golf
2019 in golf